List of Speedway World Cup meetings by city

Czech Republic (2)

Prague (2) 
 2013 Speedway World Cup Race-off
 2013 Speedway World Cup Final

Denmark (15)

Holsted (2) 
 2003 Speedway World Cup Event 1
 2003 Speedway World Cup Event 3

Outrup (2) 
 2003 Speedway World Cup Event 2
 2003 Speedway World Cup Race-off

Vojens (11) 
 2003 Speedway World Cup Final
 2007 Speedway World Cup Event 1
 2008 Speedway World Cup Race-off
 2008 Speedway World Cup Final
 2009 Speedway World Cup Event 1
 2010 Speedway World Cup Race-off
 2010 Speedway World Cup Final
 2011 Speedway World Cup Event 1
 2015 Speedway World Cup Race-off
 2015 Speedway World Cup Final
2016 Speedway World Cup Event 1

Great Britain (23)

Coventry (2) 
 2007 Speedway World Cup Event 2
 2008 Speedway World Cup Event 2

Eastbourne (3) 
 2002 Speedway World Cup Event 3
 2004 Speedway World Cup Event 1
 2004 Speedway World Cup Event 2

King's Lynn (6) 
 2010 Speedway World Cup Event 2
 2011 Speedway World Cup Event 2
 2012 Speedway World Cup Event 2
 2013 Speedway World Cup Event 2
 2014 Speedway World Cup Event 1
 2015 Speedway World Cup Event 2

Manchester (2) 
2016 Speedway World Cup Race-off
2016 Speedway World Cup Final

Peterborough (3) 
 2002 Speedway World Cup Race-off
 2002 Speedway World Cup Final
 2009 Speedway World Cup Event 2

Poole (3) 
 2002 Speedway World Cup Event 2
 2004 Speedway World Cup Race-off
 2004 Speedway World Cup Final

Reading (2) 
 2006 Speedway World Cup Race-off
 2006 Speedway World Cup Final

Sheffield (1) 
 2002 Speedway World Cup Event 1

Swindon (1) 
 2005 Speedway World Cup Event 1

Poland (21)

Bydgoszcz (3) 
 2012 Speedway World Cup Event 1
 2013 Speedway World Cup Race-off
 2013 Speedway World Cup Final

Częstochowa (1) 
 2013 Speedway World Cup Event 1

Gdańsk (3) 
 2001 Speedway World Cup Qualifying round 1
 2001 Speedway World Cup Qualifying round 2
 2001 Speedway World Cup Qualifying round 3

Gniezno  (1) 
 2015 Speedway World Cup Event 1

Gorzów Wielkopolski (3) 
 2010 Speedway World Cup Event 1
 2011 Speedway World Cup Race-off
 2011 Speedway World Cup Final

Leszno (5) 
 2007 Speedway World Cup Race-off
 2007 Speedway World Cup Final
 2008 Speedway World Cup Event 1
 2009 Speedway World Cup Race-off
 2009 Speedway World Cup Final

Rybnik (1) 
 2006 Speedway World Cup Event 1

Wrocław (4) 
 2001 Speedway World Cup Race-off
 2001 Speedway World Cup Final
 2005 Speedway World Cup Race-off
 2005 Speedway World Cup Final

Sweden (6)

Eskilstuna (1) 
 2005 Speedway World Cup Event 2

Målilla (3) 
 2006 Speedway World Cup Event 2
 2012 Speedway World Cup Race-off
 2012 Speedway World Cup Final

Västervik (2) 
 2014 Speedway World Cup Event 2
 2016 Speedway World Cup Event 2

See also
 List of Speedway Grands Prix
 Speedway World Cup

References

!